Ann Ward (born 1991) is an American fashion model.

Ann Ward may also refer to:

 Ann Ward (printer) (1715–1789), printer of The York Courant newspaper and The Life and Opinions of Tristram Shandy, Gentleman
 Ann Ward Radcliffe (1764–1823), née Ann Ward, author
 Anne Ward (suffragist) (1825–1896), temperance leader and welfare worker in New Zealand
 Anne V. Ward (1877–1971), Scottish-born American educator
 Ann Hould-Ward (born 1954), costume designer

See also

Ward (surname)